Romain Langasque (born 18 May 1995) is a French professional golfer who plays on the European Tour. He won The Amateur Championship in 2015 and in 2020 had his biggest professional success when he won the ISPS Handa Wales Open.

Amateur career
Langasque won The Amateur Championship in 2015 at Carnoustie Golf Links, beating Grant Forrest 4 and 2 in the final.

His Amateur Championship win gave an entry to the 2015 Open Championship where he made the cut and finished tied for 65th place. He also got an entry to the 2016 Masters Tournament where he was one of two amateurs to make the cut and finished tied for 39th place.

Professional career
Langasque turned professional after the 2016 Masters Tournament, thus forfeiting his exemption into the 2016 U.S. Open.

Langasque played on the Challenge Tour in 2016, where he was runner-up in the Barclays Kenya Open, the D+D Real Slovakia Challenge and the Vierumäki Finnish Challenge. He finished ninth in the Road to Oman, the order of merit, to gain entry to the European Tour for 2017.

Langasque started the 2017 European Tour season by finishing tied for tenth place in the Australian PGA Championship. This was his only top-10 finish of the season and he finished 151st in the Race to Dubai, losing his European Tour place.

In December 2017 he finished tied third at the AfrAsia Bank Mauritius Open, where he had been invited. He then missed the cut in 5 of the 6 other European Tour events he was able to play, the last of them being the HNA Open de France in July 2018. Back on the 2018 Challenge Tour, he had a difficult start, earning less than €6,000 until mid-July. From the Le Vaudreuil Golf Challenge he started playing more solidly, making eight cuts in a row, including a tied fifth place at the Kazakhstan Open in September and his first professional victory a week later at the Hopps Open de Provence.  Despite a fourth-place finish in the Ras Al Khaimah Challenge Tour Grand Final, he finished 19th in the Road to Ras Al Khaimah rankings, missing out on a European Tour place. However, less than two weeks later he finished in fifth place in the European Tour Q-School to earn a place on the European Tour for 2019.

Langasque had a successful start to the 2019 European Tour season, finishing second in the South African Open in December 2018. The event was part of the Open Qualifying Series and his high finish gave him an entry to the 2019 Open Championship, his first major as a professional. He had solo third-place finishes in the Made in Denmark tournament and the Scottish Open and finished the 2019 season 24th in the Order of Merit.

On 23 August 2020, Langasque won the ISPS Handa Wales Open by two shots over Sami Välimäki. He shot a final round 65 to overturn a five-shot deficit for his first European Tour win and advanced to 100th on the Official World Golf Ranking, tying his career best ranking from July 2019.

On 29 September 2022, in the first round of the Alfred Dunhill Links Championship, Langasque tied the course record at the Old Course in St Andrews, Scotland, with score of 11-under-par 61.

Amateur wins
2011 Tournoi Federal Jeunes
2013 Grand Prix de la Ligue Messieurs
2014 Grand Prix de Bordeaux, Trophee des Regions
2015 Southern Cross Invitational, Coupe Frayssineau Mouchy, The Amateur Championship
2016 Spanish International Amateur Championship

Source:

Professional wins (3)

European Tour wins (1)

Challenge Tour wins (1)

Challenge Tour playoff record (0–1)

French Tour wins (1)

Results in major championships
Results not in chronological order in 2020.

CUT = missed the half-way cut
"T" = tied
NT = No tournament due to COVID-19 pandemic

Results in World Golf Championships

"T" = Tied

Team appearances
Amateur
Jacques Léglise Trophy (representing Continental Europe) : 2012 (winners), 2013
European Boys' Team Championship (representing France) : 2011, 2012, 2013 (winners)
European Amateur Team Championship (representing France) : 2015

Professional
World Cup (representing France): 2016

Source:

See also
2016 Challenge Tour graduates
2018 European Tour Qualifying School graduates

References

External links

French male golfers
European Tour golfers
Olympic golfers of France
Golfers at the 2020 Summer Olympics
1995 births
Living people
21st-century French people